Mahtani is a surname. Notable people with the surname include:

Nandita Mahtani (born 1976), Indian fashion designer 
Rajan Mahtani (born 1948), Zambian businessman
Shalini Mahtani (born 1972), Hong Kong businesswoman